Christoph Staude (born 30 September 1965) is a German composer.

Life 
Born in Munich, Staude studied 1984–86 at the University of the Arts with Witold Szalonek and in 1986–91 at the Frankfurt University of Music and Performing Arts with Rolf Riehm and Bernhard Kontarsky. Since 1995, he lives as a freelance composer at the  near Neuss. There, he initiated the series Hombroich: New Music in 1997. He received  commissions and radio productions from SWR Baden-Baden for the Donaueschinger Musiktage, WDR Cologne for the Wittener Tage für neue Kammermusik, HR Frankfurt, SDR Stuttgart, BR Munich and the AUDI-AG-Kulturfond, Ingolstadt.

Honours 
1992 Stipendienaufenthalt im Deutschen Studienzentrum Venedig
1986/87 Preisträger beim Wettbewerb der Landeshauptstadt Stuttgart für junge Komponisten
1987 1. Preis beim Kompositionswettbewerb des International Center of New Music Sources (ICONS), Turin
1988 Preisträger beim Kompositionswettbewerb des Trio Basso Köln; 2. Preis beim Wettbewerb der Landeshauptstadt Stuttgart
1999 2. Preis beim Kompositionswettbewerb der musik-theater-werkstatt am Hessisches Staatstheater Wiesbaden
2003 Preisträger im internationalen Kompositionswettbewerb der Elisabeth-Schneider-Stiftung Freiburg
2005 Förderpreis des Berliner Kunstpreis

Compositions 
Stage music
Wir. Music theatre piece, libretto: Hans-Georg Wegner (after the eponymous novel by Yevgeny Zamyatin). Premiere 2006 Munich (Munich Biennale)

Orchestral work
Anangke (1985). 2nd symphonic fragment
Schacht (1986). 3rd symphonic fragment
3 Noirailles (1993)
Areal, Landschaft für Klavier und Orchester (1997). Premiere 2002 Munich, Münchner Philharmoniker, Ltg. G. Schmöhe, Jan Philip Schulze, piano
Kohinoor, Skizze zur Reise des Simurgh (2004/05). Premiere 2005 Saarbrücken, Deutsche Radio Philharmonie Saarbrücken Kaiserslautern, Ltg. P. Marchbank

Vocal compositions
Psalm 88 (1986) for three-part mixed choir and orchestra
Le Livre des Météores, Szenarium in 7 Installationen (1989/90) für Sopran, Bariton und Orchester
Trifoglio (2000) for alto voice and string quartet. Text: Yagi Jūkichi, Osip Mandelstam, Tsangyang Gyatso
Kodex (2001) for soprano and 7 instrumentalists (text from the Nuremberg Code des IPPNW, 1947). UA Nürnberg
Seven last words (2004) for soprano and piano after James Joyce
Eines Schattens Traum (2008) for choir and orchestra

Chamber music
Eisharmonie (1985) for two pianos to twelve hands
Nachbild for viola solo (1986)
Streichquartett I (1986). Premiere Turin, Arditti Quartet
Befund. Streichquartett II (1988)
All’aperto. 18 Scherben (Streichquartett III) (1992)
Fundament (1999). Fragment for organ
Per speculum in aenigmate (1999) for clarinet, violin, violoncello and piano
Interior Zone (2002) for Ensemble. Premiere Hombroich, ensemble recherche
Streichquartett VI (2003)

Releases on CD
Nachbild for viola solo (1986); Intersound GmbH München ISPV163CD, Eckart Schloifer, Vla.
Obduktion (1988) for saxophone solo; New Saxophone Chamber Music WWE 1CD 31890 col legno, Johannes Ernst, Sax.
Morpheus, Tanz/-Szene für 6 Schlagzeuger (1990); Donaueschinger Musiktage 1990, col legno AU 31819
Intercut / Zwischenschnitt. Fünfzehn Fundstücke für Sextett (1999). Dokumentation Wittener Tage für neue Kammermusik 1999
Staude-Porträt-CD Edition Zeitgenössische Musik (Deutscher Musikrat) Wergo-6546-2 (2000)

References

External links 
 
 

20th-century classical composers
21st-century classical composers
German opera composers
German composers
1965 births
Living people
Musicians from Munich